Rafael Castillo Torres, known professionally as De La Ghetto, is an American rapper, singer and songwriter, originally part of the duo Arcángel & De La Ghetto.

Early life and career 
Rafael Castillo, Jr. was born in New York and moved to San Juan, Puerto Rico, at the age of eight. He is the son of a Dominican father and a Puerto Rican mother. In 2004, he collaborated with reggaeton artist Arcángel (real name: Austin Santos) to form the duo Arcángel & De La Ghetto; the group debuted with the single "Ven Pégate", which was featured on Naldo's mixtape Sangre Nueva in 2005. He along with Arcángel signed to Zion's label Baby Records, and have appeared on numerous reggaeton albums including the compilation Mas Flow: Los Benjamins. In 2006, De La Ghetto began his solo career and appeared the next year on two hit singles, the remix of "Siente el Boom" by Tito el Bambino and a collaboration with Randy, "Sensación del Bloque" which has been viewed on YouTube over 200 million times.  Masacre Musical was released in 2008. Masacre Musical peaked at #46 on the Billboard Top Latin Albums chart in the U.S.; its single "Tú Te Imaginas" single from his album Masacre Musical peaked at #33 on the Billboard Hot Latin Tracks chart. De La Ghetto is one of the first artist to bring Latin Trap to Puerto Rico, leading the way for many of today's biggest artist. His 2018 album Mi Movimiento was nominated in 2019 for a Latin Grammy Award for "Best Urban Music Album", and the track "Caliente" was also nominated for a Latin Grammy for "Best Urban song".

Discography

Albums 
 2008: Masacre Musical
 2013: Geezy Boyz: The Album
 2018: Mi Movimiento
 2020: Los Chulitos

Mixtapes 
 The Boss of the Block (2007)
 The Boss of the Block, Vol. 2 (2007)
 Masacre Musical Mixtape (2007)
 Masacre Musical Presents: El Movimiento (2008)
 Masacre Musical Presents: El Movimiento, Vol. II (2010)

Singles

As lead artist

As featured artist

References

External links 
 
 

Living people
American hip hop singers
American people of Puerto Rican descent
American singers of Dominican Republic descent
Latin trap musicians
Puerto Rican people of Dominican Republic descent
Puerto Rican reggaeton musicians
Urbano musicians
Year of birth missing (living people)
Sony BMG Norte artists
Warner Music Latina artists